This article lists the major power stations located in Qinghai province.

Non-renewable

Coal, gas and fuel-oil-based

Renewable

Hydroelectric

Conventional

References 

Power stations
Qinghai